Shaher Shaheen (born January 2, 1990, in Jeddah, Saudi Arabia) is a professional footballer who plays as a defender for Mohammedan in the I-League. Born in Saudi Arabia, he has represented Syria at youth level.

Club career

Earlier career
Shaher Shaheen signed for Al-Karamah SC as a youth team player on 2009 and rose through the club's youth sides before moving to Jordan League Division 1 side Al-Asalah in 2013.

Mohammedan
In June 2021, Shaheen moved to India and signed with Mohammedan SC, that competes in the I-League.

He was part of the team's 2021 Durand Cup campaign, in which he appeared in all the matches, and reached to the final, defeating FC Bengaluru United 4–2. On 3 October 2021, they lost the title winning match 1–0 to ISL side FC Goa.

He also appeared in the 2021–22 Calcutta Premier Division league, in which Mohammedan reached to the final, defeating United SC 1–0. On 18 November, Mohammedan clinched their 12th Calcutta Football League title after forty long years, defeating Railway FC 1–0, in which he played.

He made his league debut on 27 December in their 2–1 win against Sudeva Delhi FC. Under Nikola Stojanović's captaincy, Shaheen and his team Mohammedan for the first time, ran for their maiden national league title in 2021–22 I-League season, but finished as runners-up after a 2–1 defeat to Gokulam Kerala at the end.

International career
Shaher Shaheen was a member of the Syrian U-20 national team and appeared in couple of matches in 2009.

Honours
Mohammedan Sporting
Calcutta Football League: 2021, 2022
Durand Cup runner-up: 2021
I-League runner-up: 2021–22

References

External links
 Career stats at goalzz.com
Shaher Shaheen at flashscore.in

1990 births
Living people
Sportspeople from Homs
Association football defenders
Syrian footballers
Syrian expatriate footballers
Syrian expatriate sportspeople in Jordan
Expatriate footballers in Jordan
Al-Karamah players
Al-Watani Club players
Saudi First Division League players
Syrian Premier League players
Mohammedan SC (Kolkata) players
Calcutta Football League players